Ain El Fouara Fountain is an emblematic and famous monument of Setif in Algeria. This fountain consists of a statue made in 1898 by the French sculptor Francis de Saint-Vidal.

The statue, representing a totally naked woman, is the subject of several acts of vandalism.

History 
It was initially a simple fountain built around a spring by Military engineering after the occupation of Sétif. Its water was warm during winter and fresh in summer. But its progressive deterioration obliged the municipal council to think about its restoration. Especially M. Bastide, councilor, who addressed the issue of the reparation of the fountain in 1894. Two years later in 1896, the mayor of Sétif, M. Aubry, during a trip in Paris, asked the director of “Les Beaux-Arts” to donate a statue that will be used for the decoration of the fountain.

In 1898, the mayor received a letter informing him that the statue made by Francis de Saint-Vidal was ready.

The establishment of the statue and all work was finished in 1899.

On 22 April 1997, the statue was damaged in a bomb blast blamed on islamists and on 28 February 2006 an Islamist damaged the statue with a hammer. Each time it was repaired. On 18 December 2017, a man defaced the statue for a third time, removing the facial features and breasts with a hammer and chisel. The restored statue was unveiled on 4 August 2018, only to suffer a further Islamist attack on 9 October 2018. The minister, Azzedine Mihoubi, announced on Twitter that the damage was slight and would be repaired.

See also
Aniconism in Islam
 List of cultural assets of Algeria

References

Monuments and memorials in Algeria
Buildings and structures in Sétif Province
Vandalized works of art